The Fan (Spanish: El Hincha) is a 1951 Argentine sports comedy film and directed by Manuel Romero and starring Enrique Santos Discépolo, Diana Maggi and Mario Passano.

Cast
 Enrique Santos Discépolo 
 Diana Maggi 
 Mario Passano 
 María Esther Buschiazzo 
 Renée Dumas 
 Lía Durán 
 Vicente Forastieri
 Juan José Porta 
 Mariano Bauzá
 Héctor Casares 
 Mario Conflitti 
 Pablo Cumo 
 Mario Faig 
 Antonio Provitilo
 Aída Villadeamigo

External links
 

1951 films
1950s sports comedy films
Argentine sports comedy films
1950s Spanish-language films
Argentine black-and-white films
Films directed by Manuel Romero
Argentine association football films
1951 comedy films
1950s Argentine films